Your Cheatin' Heart is a 1964 American fictionalized biographical-musical directed by Gene Nelson and starring George Hamilton as country singer Hank Williams. It co-stars Susan Oliver and Red Buttons.

Plot
A young Hank Williams is trying to earn money by pitching a snake-oil cure-all to the gullible, capping his spiel by picking up his guitar and singing. In the crowd are the Drifting Cowboys, a group of touring country-western musicians who happen to be passing through.  They invite Williams to join their group, and music history is made.

Cast
 George Hamilton as Hank Williams
 Susan Oliver as Audrey Williams
 Red Buttons as Shorty Younger
 Arthur O'Connell as Fred Rose
 Shary Marshall as Ann Younger
 Rex Ingram as Teetot
 Chris Crosby as Sam Priddy
 Rex Holman as Charley Bybee
 Hortense Petra as Wilma, the Cashier
 Roy Engel as Joe Rauch
 Donald Losby as Young Hank Williams
 Kevin Tate as Boy Fishing

Production

Development
MGM's music division owned the rights to the Hank Williams songbook. In 1956, it was announced the studio would make the movie with producer Joe Pasternak, employing Jeff Richards and June Allyson in the lead roles. Then Elvis Presley was considered as a possible star, to make his follow-up movie for MGM following Jailhouse Rock. However, Colonel Tom Parker refused.

Paul Gregory became attached as producer and wanted Steve McQueen for the lead. MGM then offered the role to Nick Adams, but he turned it down as well. According to George Hamilton, MGM then "revised their concept of the film as quickie drive-in fare that might sell some records in the South and maybe to some crossover Beverly Hillbillies fans." They assigned their film to producer Sam Katzman who specialized in low budget fare.

In November 1963 Standford Whitmore was writing The Hank Williams Story for Katzman. The film was made with the assistance of Williams' widow Audrey and featuring the songs ("Long Gone Lonesome Blues", "I Can’t Help It", and "Hey, Good Lookin’") lip-synched by Hamilton but sung by Hank Williams, Jr.

Casting
Parker was friendly with George Hamilton, who had been a fan of Williams' music since his youth, knew every song Williams had written and could also play the guitar. Hamilton was under contract to MGM but says the studio "didn't see their stock company preppy playboy playing a drug addict honky-tonk crooner".

Parker introduced Hamilton to Hank Williams' ex-wife Audrey. The two got along well and Audrey lobbied on Hamilton's behalf. Hamilton said, "Audrey wanted the movie to happen, especially to make her son, Hank Williams Jr., a singing star the same way she had pushed Big Hank to stardom." The idea was that Williams Jr would dub the singing in the movie and release the soundtrack album under his name; Hamilton wanted to perform the songs himself -- "that was the key to the character"—but knew the only way he would get the part was to agree to be dubbed. With Audrey's support, Hamilton got the part, his signing being announced in November 1963.

Paula Prentiss was at one stage attached as female star.

Filming
Filming started in April 1964. Hamilton says Sam Katzman ran a tight ship. "Jungle Sam cracked the whip, whacked the cane and the whole film was in the can right on time. But he gave me free rein creatively and our director... brought in something memorable, and even Sam knew it."

The end scene (when the audience is notified that Williams has died while on the way there) portrays an actual event, as one audience member stands up unprompted and begins to sing "I Saw the Light". Others stand up quickly and join him, as the spotlight shines on the stage where Hank should be. This was similar to what actually happened after Williams died, as Hawkshaw Hawkins and several musicians began singing "I Saw the Light", and the crowd joined in, thinking at first that the announcement was an act, but when Hawkins and company began singing, the crowd realized it was no act.

Release
The film was originally released in 1964 in black and white, and has the distinction of being the final MGM musical film to be produced in black and white. According to Hamilton, "the movie made me a hero in the South, but because it was a small film, it didn't get the exposure it deserved in the rest of the country." Among the film's fans were Colonel Tom Parker and Hamilton's later girlfriends Lynda Bird Johnson and Alana Hamilton.

The film was colorized by Turner Entertainment in 1990. The colorized version made its debut over SuperStation WTBS on January 1, 1991, the 38th anniversary of Hank Williams, Sr.'s death. Your Cheatin' Heart was released on DVD November 9, 2010, by Warner Archive as a MOD (Manufacture On Demand) disc via Amazon (Black and White version). The colorized version has never been released on any form of home media, but DVD-Rs of it frequently show up on websites specializing in bootlegs of rare movies.

See also
List of American films of 1964

References

 George Hamilton & William Stadiem, Don't Mind If I Do, Simon & Schuster 2008

External links
 
 
 
 

1964 films
1960s biographical films
1964 musical films
American biographical films
American musical films
Biographical films about singers
Country music films
1960s English-language films
Films set in the 1930s
Films set in the 1940s
Films set in the 1950s
Metro-Goldwyn-Mayer films
Cultural depictions of Hank Williams
Films directed by Gene Nelson
1960s American films